Domingo Antonio Ramos (born March 9, 1958) is a former professional baseball player who was an infielder in Major League Baseball from 1978 to 1990. In 1982 with the Seattle Mariners, he filled in at all four infield positions. Ramos hit over .200 just twice, .283 in 1983 and .311 in 1987, in 103 at-bats.

Ramos earned his first career hit on May 23, 1980. On June 26, 1982, he recorded his first career RBI. His first career home run came on an April 17, 1983, in a 7–4 loss against the Oakland Athletics. His first career stolen base came two days later, in a 6–2 loss at the Minnesota Twins. His first career four-hit game came on September 8, 1987, in a 7–0 win over the Cleveland Indians.

On November 10, 1978, he was traded by New York Yankees with Dave Rajsich, Larry McCall, Sparky Lyle, Mike Heath and Cash to Texas Rangers for Greg Jemison, Paul Mirabella, Mike Griffin, Juan Beniquez and Dave Righetti.

In 1981, he was selected by the Seattle Mariners from the Toronto Blue Jays in the rule 5 draft.

References

External links

1958 births
Living people
Águilas Cibaeñas players
California Angels players
Chicago Cubs players
Cleveland Indians players
Dominican Republic expatriate baseball players in Canada
Dominican Republic expatriate baseball players in the United States
Edmonton Trappers players

Major League Baseball infielders
Major League Baseball players from the Dominican Republic
New York Yankees players
Seattle Mariners players
Syracuse Chiefs players
Toronto Blue Jays players
Colorado Springs Sky Sox players
Columbus Clippers players
Fort Lauderdale Yankees players
Oneonta Yankees players
Salt Lake City Gulls players
Tacoma Yankees players
West Haven Yankees players